Kelvinhall (Partick Cross until 1977) is an underground station on the Glasgow Subway, renamed after the nearby Kelvin Hall. It is located in the West End of Glasgow, Scotland, near to many of the city's best known tourist destinations including:
The Kelvingrove Art Gallery and Museum
Kelvingrove Park
The University of Glasgow

There was previously a Kelvin Hall railway station, but it was unattached to the subway station, which was at any rate still known as Partick Cross at the time of that station's closure in 1964 as part of the Beeching axe.

The station entrance is located off Dumbarton Road at the end of a narrow arcade of shops below flats. The station retains its original island platform layout and has no escalators. The renovation work at Kelvinhall station during the 1977–1980 modernisation of the Subway was not as extensive as most of the other stations on the network: other than Cessnock, it is the only station to retain its original entrance and surface buildings, which would be virtually invisible from the street without the signage.

Kelvinhall (under its former name of Partick Cross) is one of the stations mentioned in Cliff Hanley's song The Glasgow Underground.

The Glasgow Subway is operated by the Strathclyde Partnership for Transport (SPT).

Transport links
First Glasgow operated bus routes 2, 3, 8, 77, 90, M4 and N2 serve the station. Other bus routes that serve Kelvinhall are the riversider service 100, operated by Community Transport Glasgow, routes 189 and 190, operated by Hobson Travel and ARG Travel, and routes X25 and X25A, operated by Stagecoach West Scotland.

Past passenger numbers 
 2011/12: 0.646 million annually

Gallery

References

Glasgow Subway stations
Railway stations in Great Britain opened in 1896
Railway stations located underground in the United Kingdom
Partick